The Cape Town Cycle Tour is an annual cycle race hosted in Cape Town, South Africa, usually  long. It is the first event outside Europe to be included in the Union Cycliste Internationale's Golden Bike Series.

South Africa hosts some of the largest, by the number of entrants, sporting events in the world with three being the largest of their type. The Cape Town Cycle Tour, with as many as 35 000 cyclists taking part, is the world's largest individually timed cycle race. The other two are the world's largest ultra-marathon running event, the Comrades Marathon, and the world's largest open water swim, the Midmar Mile.

The Cycle Tour formed the last leg of the Giro del Capo, a multi-stage race for professional and leading registered riders which was last run in 2010.

It is traditionally staged on the second Sunday of March and has enjoyed well-known competitors such as Miguel Indurain, Jan Ulrich, Matt Damon, Helen Zille and Lance Armstrong.

Route
In recent years the race has usually followed a scenic  circular route from Cape Town down the Cape Peninsula and back. The race starts at the Grand Parade in Cape Town. It then follows a short section of the N2 called Nelson Mandela Boulevard, then the M3 to Muizenberg, and then Main Road along the False Bay coast to Simon's Town and Smitswinkel Bay. The route then crosses the peninsula in a westerly direction, past the entrance to Cape of Good Hope section of the Table Mountain National Park (within which Cape Point is situated). It then heads north along the Atlantic coast through Scarborough, Kommetjie, Noordhoek, Chapmans Peak, Hout Bay over Suikerbossie hill to Camps Bay and ends next to the Cape Town Stadium in Green Point.

Records
The course records for conventional bicycles for the 110 km course over Chapman's Peak are:
Men: 02:27:29 by Robbie Hunter (2008)
Women: 02:44:04 by Renee Scott (1991).

The record for the highest number of consecutive victories within a competitor's age group belongs to Penny Krohn, who scored 25 such age group wins.

By far the quickest time ever recorded (and highest ever average speed) was set on the 105 km course in 1993 by Wimpie van der Merwe in his fully faired recumbent (02:16:40, averaging 46.1 km/h).

The oldest cyclist to complete the race within the maximum allowed seven hours is Japie Malan (92 years old at the time) during the 2012 Cyle Tour – on a tandem in a time of 05:49:00. He is the oldest man (90 years old at the time) to complete the race on a single bicycle during the 2010 Cycle Tour in a time of 06:48:52. He is also the oldest man to have ridden the Argus for the first time, which he did in 2004 when he was 84 years old. The oldest woman to complete the race is Mary Warner (80 years old at the time) during the 2006 tour, in a time of 06:43:38.

History of the Cycle Tour

In 1978, Bill Mylrea and John Stegmann organised the Big Ride-In to draw attention to the need for cycle paths in South Africa. The Ride-In drew hundreds of cyclists, including the Mayor of Cape Town at the time. The ride was first won by Lawrence Whittaker in September 1978.

The organisers convinced an initially reluctant Cape Argus, a local newspaper and sponsor, to grant the event the right to use its name.

The event now forms part of one of five cycling events which take place over a period of one week starting a week before the Cycle Tour and culminating in the Cycle Tour.  The other events include:

 Tricycle Tour (youngsters under 6 years of age)
 Junior Cycle Tour (youngsters between 6 and 12 years of age)
 MTB Challenge (Mountain Bike)
 Giro del Capo (5-day pro stage race, the last day of which is the Cycle Tour itself)

Route alterations and stoppages 

Between 2000 and 2003, the race followed an alternative route due to the closure of Chapman's Peak Drive, with a return trip via Ou Kaapse Weg and the Blue Route.

The race has been stopped three times due to extreme weather, although in the first two cases many competitors had completed the race before the stoppage, and once significantly shortened due to fire. It has been cancelled once:
 The 2002 race was stopped at 14:45 at Ou Kaapse Weg when temperatures reached 
 The 2009 race was stopped at 16:30 at Chapman's Peak due to strong winds, with gusts up to   that blew cyclists off their cycles. Initially the cut off time was extended from 7 to 8 hours due to the strong wind. Despite the late closure many cyclists were affected, because starting for some groups was delayed by as much as 2 hours due to extreme winds at the starting line-up.
 The 2015 race took place on a significantly shortened route of 47 km to the end of the Blue Route and back, following a major fire earlier that month that led to the closure of Chapman's Peak Drive and parts of Ou Kaapse Weg.
 The 2017 race was cancelled on the day due to extreme weather.  Wind speeds in excess of 100 km/h in addition to fires on part of the route caused the event organisers to cancel after the first round of cyclists had started the race.  The threat of possible protest action along a section of the route also increased safety concerns.  Participants who had started already were turned back at the end of the M3 highway.

Details of each event 
Key information regarding each of the race events is as follows:

See also 
 94.7 Cycle Challenge

References

External links 
 Official Website

 
Sport in Cape Town
Cycle races in South Africa
Recurring sporting events established in 1978
Road bicycle races
1978 establishments in South Africa
Autumn events in South Africa